Oncideres crassicornis is a species of beetle in the family Cerambycidae. It was described by Henry Walter Bates in 1865. It is known from Ecuador, Peru and Brazil.

References

crassicornis
Beetles described in 1865